In American politics, straight-ticket voting or straight-party voting refers to the practice of voting for every candidate that a political party has on a general election ballot. The term can also refer to a straight-ticket voting option, sometimes known as a master lever, that allows voters to check a box and vote for all of a party's candidates, instead of voting for each race individually.

History 

The vast majority of ballots cast in the United States before the 1960s were straight-ticket ballots. However, straight-ticket voting experienced a steady decline through the 2000s as a result of many political factors. The drift of the Democratic Party away from its roots in the Reconstruction era's Redeemers led to the collapse of straight-ticket voting in the Solid South, as southern voters began to vote for Dixiecrats (Conservative southern Democrats) at the local level while backing Republicans at the national level. At the same time, the Democratic Party moved to the center under Bill Clinton and the New Democrats. With fewer distinctions between the two parties, voters were more likely to focus on the specifics of different candidates.

However, straight-ticket voting experienced a resurgence in the 2010s. The success of the Southern strategy has resulted in Republicans dominating at all levels in the American South, and increasing political polarization has created a large ideological distance between the two parties.

Straight-ticket voting in individual American states 

Straight-ticket voting options differ from state to state. States that have a straight-ticket voting option include Alabama, Indiana, Kentucky, Michigan, Oklahoma, and South Carolina; many other states had straight-ticket options before repealing them.

Iowa 

Iowa repealed its straight-ticket option in 2017.

Indiana

Indiana abolished the straight-ticket vote for at-large elections in 2016, but retains it for all other partisan races.

Michigan 

General-election ballots in Michigan have three sections:

 The partisan section, which includes candidates for partisan offices;
 The non-partisan section, which includes candidates for judgeships, most municipal offices, and school boards; and
 The proposals section, which includes state and local ballot issues.

Voters in Michigan have long been able to vote a straight ticket or a split ticket (voting for individual candidates in individual offices).

Straight-ticket voting only involved the partisan section of the ballot, meaning that if an individual wished to vote in a non-partisan race or for or against a proposal, they had to cast those votes individually. One area in which this issue received attention was in races for the Michigan Supreme Court. All parties on the ballot can nominate candidates for Justice of the Supreme Court at their party conventions (2–3 months before the election for primary-eligible parties, or before the August primary for alternative parties which nominate only at conventions or county caucuses).  However, the races appear on the ballot in the nonpartisan section, meaning that a straight-ticket vote for either of these parties would not include a vote for that party's candidates for Supreme Court.

The Michigan Legislature passed and Governor Rick Snyder signed SB 13 on January 5, 2015, which repeals and abolishes straight-ticket voting in the state. This follows failed attempts to abolish it in 1964 and 2001-2002 after voter referendums repealing abolition. With a $5 million appropriation in SB 13, however, a voter referendum is no longer possible due to a constitutional prohibition on referendums on bills appropriating moneys by the Legislature.

In 2018, Michigan voters passed a constitutional amendment ballot proposal that restored straight-ticket voting, which went around the prohibition on appropriated money bills.

North Carolina 

North Carolina had an option for voting "straight party" (using the term from an NC ballot) that did not include a vote for the President and Vice President of the United States, through the 2012 elections. A voter ID law enacted in 2013 abolished all straight-ticket voting in the state, and went into effect in 2014. The bill eliminating it was HB 589.

Under the former system, North Carolina made separate selections for the President/Vice President and the straight-party option. This idiosyncrasy on the North Carolina ballot was described by some as "a ballot flaw," potentially resulting in voters failing to cast a vote for President and Vice President when doing so was their intent. It was introduced in the 1960s to shore up Democrats at the state level as Republicans were gaining strength at the national level. In the 2000 presidential election, there was a 3.15% "undervote" (i.e. (total voter turnout - total votes for President and Vice President) / total voter turnout); in the 2004 presidential election, there was a 2.57% undervote. This means that in raw numbers, more than 92,000 North Carolina voters in the 2000 election turned out to vote but did not vote for president; similarly, in 2004, more than 75,000 North Carolina voters turned out to vote but not vote for president.

Pennsylvania
Pennsylvania repealed its straight-ticket option in 2019. The repeal went into effect in 2020.

Texas 

On June 1, 2017, Governor Greg Abbott signed into law House Bill 25, which eliminates the straight-ticket voting option in Texas for all races beginning in 2020.

Previous rules:

In Texas, a vote for a straight-party ticket cast votes for all party candidates in all races where the party was fielding a candidate and the voter was eligible to cast a vote, from the President/Vice President (or Governor) to the county constable or justice of the peace.

A voter, however, could vote a straight-party ticket and subsequently cast an individual vote in a particular race.  This could happen in cases where
the voter's party did not field a candidate in a specific race, and the voter wanted to cast a vote in that race for one of the candidates from another party, and/or
the voter did not wish to support the party's candidate in a specific race, but wished to vote for another candidate in that race.  (However, Texas did not have a "none of the above" option; in a case where a voter wished not to vote for any candidate in a race where his/her party was fielding one, the voter had to cast a vote in each individual race separately and could not choose the straight-party option.)  In some Texas counties, an individual vote would not override the straight-party vote: If a voter chose the straight-party option, then voted for a single candidate from another party, votes for that race were recorded for both candidates.

Straight-party voting was only available in the general election for partisan elections.  It was not available for:
party primary elections
non-partisan races (such as City Council or School Board elections); even if a slate of candidates was endorsed by a particular group the slate could be elected on a single ticket, each candidate had to be selected individually.
ballot issues (such as an amendment to the Texas Constitution or a measure to approve bonds and assess taxes for their repayment), even if a political party officially endorsed or opposed such an amendment.

In those cases where a partisan election was combined with a non-partisan election and/or ballot issues, the voter could vote straight-party in the partisan portion, but then had to vote individually in the other portion(s).

Utah

Utah repealed its straight-ticket option in 2020.

West Virginia 

In West Virginia, voting "straight party" included a vote for all candidates of the party voters selected, including the President and Vice President of the United States. Non-partisan candidates had to be voted separately. In 2015, however, straight-ticket voting was eliminated as an option on ballots through an Act of the State Legislature signed by Governor Earl Ray Tomblin, SB 249.

Others 
The Seneca Nation of Indians, which operates under a republican form of government on reservations within the bounds of the state of New York, offers a straight-ticket voting option. To qualify, a political party must field candidates in each seat up for election in a given year. In practice, only the Seneca Party, which has been the dominant party in the nation's politics for decades, has ever received the straight-ticket option. Opponents of the Seneca Party have accused the party of using the straight-ticket option to eavesdrop on voters and punish them with the loss of their jobs if they do not use it, also using the promise of jobs to those running in opposing parties to get them to drop out and deny those parties the straight-ticket option.

Similar systems outside of the United States

In Australia, the use of Group voting ticket, through which voters can select a party or group "above the line" to distribute the voter's preferences to all candidates of the same party in multi-winner elections, has declined, and is currently used for elections to the Victorian Legislative Council, the upper house of the legislature in the Australian state of Victoria.

See also 
 Coattail effect
 Split-ticket voting

References

Voting in the United States